The Ranasan State was a small princely state belonging to the Mahi Kantha Agency of the Bombay Presidency during the era of the British Raj. It had its capital in Ranasan village, Talod municipality, Sabarkantha district of present-day Gujarat State.

History 
The state was ruled by the Rehvar clan of the Hindu Parmar dynasty of Rajputs. 

Ranasan State was merged with Baroda State under the Attachment Scheme on 10 July 1943. Finally, Baroda State acceded to the Indian Union on 1 May 1949.

Rulers
The rulers of Ranasan State bore the title 'Thakur'.

.... – ....                Rajsinhji
.... – ....                Sursinhji Rajsinhji 
.... – ....                Garibdasji Surinhji 
.... – ....                Adesinhji Garibdasji 
.... – 1768                Bharatsinhji Adesinhji 
1768 – 1802                Khumansinhji Bharatsinhji          (d. 1802)  
1802 – 1828                Makansinhji Khumansinhji           (d. 1828) 
1828 – 18..                Raisinhji Makansinhji 
18.. – 1879                Vajesinhji Sartansinhji            (b. 1814 – d. 1879) 
1879  – 1842                Lalsinhji Narsinhji 
1842 – 18..                Sartansinhji Karansinhji 
18..-  5 February 1890         Hamirsinhji Vajesinhji             (d. 1890) 
 5 February 1890 – 28 April 1914  Kishorsihji Jiwatsinhji            (b. 1869 – d. 1914) 
28 Apr 1914 –  5 August 1917  Prathisinhji Fatehsinhji           (b. 1881 – d. 1917) 
 5 August 1917 – 1938         Takhatsinhji Fatehsinhji           (b. 1883 – d. 1938) 
 2 December 1938 – 1947         Jashwantsinhji Takhatsinhji        (b. 1916 – d. 1964)

See also
List of Rajput dynasties and states
Mahi Kantha Agency

References

Sabarkantha district
Princely states of Gujarat
1943 disestablishments in India
Rajputs